The 1974–75 ABA season was the franchise's eighth season and first as the Nuggets. The Nuggets were ranked first in points per game (118.7 ppg). They also had the best record in the ABA, 65-19, though they lost in the Division Finals to the Pacers.

Roster

Standings

Eastern Division

Western Division

Game log
 1974-75 Denver Rockets Schedule and Results | Basketball-Reference.com

Stats

Playoffs

Western Semifinals

Nuggets win series 4–2

Western Division Finals

Nuggets lose series 4–3

Awards and honors

League leaders
 Field goal percentage: Bobby Jones
 Free throw percentage: Mack Calvin
 Assists per game:Mack Calvin
 Offensive Rating: Dave Robisch

All-ABA Teams
 Mack Calvin - 1st Team

All-Defensive Team
 Bobby Jones

All-Rookie Team
 Bobby Jones

ABA All-Stars
 Mack Calvin
 Mike Green
 Ralph Simpson

Transactions

References

Denver Nuggets seasons
Denver
Denver Nuggets
Denver Nuggets